Haworthia maraisii is a species of flowering plant in the family Asphodeloideae, found in the southwest Cape Provinces of South Africa. It has been treated as a variety of either Haworthia magnifica or Haworthia mirabilis, but is accepted as a full species in the World Checklist of Selected Plant Families.

References

maraisii